Courthouse Bay is a subdivision of Marine Corps Base Camp Lejeune and is home to the Marine Corps Engineer School, 2nd Combat Engineer Battalion, and the 2nd Assault Amphibian Battalion. Located near Camp Lejeune's southwestern Sneads Ferry gate, the sub-camp is largely self-sufficient, in that it has its own chow hall, post exchange, MWR recreation facilities, and water supply.

References

Military installations in North Carolina
United States Marine Corps bases
1941 establishments in North Carolina